Elbert Crawford (June 20, 1966 – May 2, 2013 ) was an American football offensive lineman who played two seasons with the New England Patriots of the National Football League (NFL). He was drafted by the Los Angeles Rams in the eighth round of the 1990 NFL Draft. He played college football at Arkansas and attended Hall High School in Little Rock, Arkansas. Crawford was also a member of the Denver Broncos.  He died of an apparent heart attack on May 2, 2013, in Little Rock, Arkansas.

References

External links
Just Sports Stats

1966 births
2013 deaths
Players of American football from Chicago
American football offensive linemen
Arkansas Razorbacks football players
New England Patriots players
Hall High School (Arkansas) alumni